The Finsterwalder Funfex is a German high-wing, single-place, hang glider, designed and produced by Finsterwalder.

Design and development
The Funfex and the smaller-sized Airfex are intended as man-packable double-surface intermediate gliders for recreational cross-country flying. As such the Funfex weighs only  and can be reduced to a folded size of 

The aircraft is made from aluminum tubing, with the wing covered in Dacron sailcloth. Its  span wing is cable braced from a single kingpost. The nose angle is 120° and the aspect ratio is 5.5:1.

Variants
Airfex
DHV certified as Class 1-2.
Funfex
DHV certified as Class 2.

Specifications (Funfex)

References

External links

Hang gliders